Emmerdale is the debut studio album by Swedish pop rock band The Cardigans. It was originally released in Sweden by Trampolene Records on 18 February 1994, and on 24 September 1994 in Japan. It was later reissued in Europe in January 1999 and in Canada in May the same year. A special U.S. version was released in August 1999 by Minty Fresh Records and features a bonus disc of songs from The Cardigans' second album Life. These songs were not released in the U.S. edition of said album and were previously unavailable on any U.S. release.  The album was named after the British television soap opera of the same name.

Track listing 
All songs written by Peter Svensson and Magnus Sveningsson, except where noted.

 
1 Originally performed by Black Sabbath.
2 These tracks are from the 1995 album Life but were not included on the US version.

Personnel 
Lars-Olof Johansson – acoustic guitar, piano
Bengt Lagerberg – percussion, bassoon, drums, recorder
Nina Persson – vocals
Magnus Sveningsson – bass
Peter Svensson – bass, guitar, percussion, piano, arranger, conductor, vocals, bells, vibraphone

Additional personnel
David Åhlén – violin
Ivan Bakran – grand piano
Björn Engelmann – mastering
Lasse Johansson – guitar, piano
Tore Johansson – trumpet, producer, beats
Anders Kristensson – photography
Jens Lingård – trombone
Andreas Mattsson – art direction, design
Anders Nordgren – flute

Charts

Certifications

References

External links
 Emmerdale microsite
 The Cardigans' Complete Discography @ Marvelhill
 

1994 debut albums
The Cardigans albums
Albums produced by Tore Johansson